The Drones performed for two nights at the Annandale Hotel in Sydney, Australia in October 2007. Both nights were recorded with the intention of releasing a limited live album. Live at the Annandale Hotel 18th, 19th October 2007 is the first in a series of live albums produced by the Annandale Hotel music venue. This vinyl-exclusive release was limited to 250 hand-numbered, autographed copies.

Track listing
 "Jezebel"
 "Shark Fin Blues"
 "I'm Here Now"
 "Locust"
 "Abortion"
 "Miller's Daughter"

Personnel
 Gareth Liddiard – vocals, guitar
 Fiona Kitschin – bass
 Dan Luscombe – guitar
 Michael Noga – drums
 Matthew Rule – executive producer
 Burnie Malletin – recording, layout
 Adrian Grigorieff – recording
 Ryan Hazel – mixing
 Rick O'Neil – mastering
 Collin Lucas – photos

References

The Drones (Australian band) albums
2007 live albums